In mathematics, Sard's theorem, also known as Sard's lemma or the Morse–Sard theorem, is a result in mathematical analysis that asserts that the set of critical values (that is, the image of the set of critical points) of a smooth function f from one Euclidean space or manifold to another is a null set, i.e., it has Lebesgue measure 0. This makes the set of critical values "small" in the sense of a generic property. The theorem is named for Anthony Morse and Arthur Sard.

Statement 
More explicitly, let

be , (that is,  times continuously differentiable), where .

Intuitively speaking, this means that although  may be large, its image must be small in the sense of Lebesgue measure: while  may have many critical points in the domain , it must have few critical values in the image .

The critical set  of a  function 
 
consists of those points at which the differential 
 
This formulation of the result follows from the version for Euclidean spaces by taking a countable set of coordinate patches. The conclusion of the theorem is a local statement, since a countable union of sets of measure zero is a set of measure zero, and the property of a subset of a coordinate patch having zero measure is invariant under diffeomorphism.

Variants 
There are many variants of this lemma, which plays a basic role in singularity theory among other fields. The case  was proven by Anthony P. Morse in 1939, and the general case by Arthur Sard in 1942.

A version for infinite-dimensional Banach manifolds was proven by Stephen Smale.

The statement is quite powerful, and the proof involves analysis. In topology it is often quoted — as in the Brouwer fixed-point theorem and some applications in Morse theory — in order to prove the weaker corollary that “a non-constant smooth map has at least one regular value”.

Caveat: The Hausdorff dimension of  can be arbitrarily close to r.

See also
 Generic property

References

Further reading

 
 

Lemmas in analysis
Smooth functions
Multivariable calculus
Singularity theory
Theorems in analysis
Theorems in differential geometry
Theorems in measure theory